Saint-Flour-de-Mercoire is a commune in the Lozère department in southern France. The Robert Louis Stevenson Trail (GR 70), a popular long-distance path, runs through the village.

See also
Communes of the Lozère department

References

Saintflourdemercoire